The 2002 Rally Argentina (formally the 22nd Rally Argentina) was the sixth round of the 2002 World Rally Championship. The race was held over three days between 17 May and 19 May 2002, and was won by Ford's Carlos Sainz, his 24th win in the World Rally Championship, after the disqualification of Peugeot drivers Marcus Grönholm and Richard Burns for illegal help and underweight flywheel respectively.

Background

Entry list

Itinerary
All dates and times are ART (UTC−3).

Results

Overall

World Rally Cars

Classification

Special stages

Championship standings

Production World Rally Championship

Classification

Special stages

Championship standings

References

External links 
 Official website of the World Rally Championship

Argentina
Rally Argentina
Rally